Gayville is an unincorporated community in Lawrence County, in the U.S. state of South Dakota.

History
Gayville was founded as a mining community in the 1870s by brothers Alfred and Wiliam Gay, and named for them.

References

Unincorporated communities in Lawrence County, South Dakota
Unincorporated communities in South Dakota